Sisurcana latiloba is a species of moth of the family Tortricidae. It is found in Peru.

The wingspan is about 20 mm. The ground colour of the forewings is cream ferruginous, mixed with greyish terminally. The strigulation (fine streaks) and markings are rust. The hindwings are pale ferruginous, but grey in the anal and basal area, with grey rust dots posteriorly.

Etymology
The species name refers to the shape of the transtilla and is derived from Latin latus (meaning broad) and lobus (meaning a lobe).

References

Moths described in 2010
Sisurcana
Moths of South America
Taxa named by Józef Razowski